Alexandra Barreto is an American actress who starred in the 2006 television series Pepper Dennis with her husband Rider Strong and Rebecca Romijn and in the horror film Tooth and Nail, a part of the annual After Dark Horrorfest in 2007. She has also appeared in the recurring role of Ana Gutierrez on The Fosters.

Career 

Barreto has appeared in films such as "Quitters", "Blood Makes Me", "Ghost Game", "La Torcedura", Exposed, "Beautiful", "Woman On Fire", "Farewell Collette", and Disney's The Kid. Her television appearances include 9 episodes of the TV police drama The District and was five episodes of "The American Family".

In 2008, Alexandra participated in a television commercial for the Barack Obama presidential campaign entitled "It Could Happen To You" along with Rider Strong and Shiloh Strong. The commercial won MoveOn.org's contest for funniest ad and aired on Comedy Central.

Personal life

Barreto began dating actor Rider Strong after they met while filming the 2006 television series Pepper Dennis. They became engaged in December 2012, and married on October 20, 2013, in Oregon. The couple has one son, Indigo "Indy" Barreto Strong, born in December 2014.

Filmography

References

External links 
 
 

21st-century American actresses
American film actresses
American television actresses
Living people
Place of birth missing (living people)
1975 births